The Vidarbha cricket team is an Indian domestic cricket team plays in the India's domestic first-class cricket competition Ranji Trophy and limited-overs Vijay Hazare Trophy and Syed Mushtaq Ali Trophy. It represents the Vidarbha region of eastern Maharashtra. In December 2017, they reached the final of the Ranji Trophy for the first time in their history, after they beat Karnataka by 5 runs in the semi-finals of the 2017–18 Ranji Trophy tournament. In the final, they beat Delhi by 9 wickets to win their first Ranji Trophy. In the 2018-19 Ranji Trophy, Vidarbha successfully defended the crown by defeating Saurashtra by 78 runs in the final played at Nagpur.

History
Vidarbha first played first-class cricket in the 1957–58 season, competing against the other Central Zone teams until 2001-02, after which the Ranji Trophy was no longer contested on a zonal basis. Before the 2017-18 season, Vidarbha's best seasons were 1970-71 and 1995–96, when it reached the quarter-finals of the Ranji Trophy and 2002–03 and 2011–12, when it reached the semi-finals of the Plate Group. Up to the start of the 2017-18 season, Vidarbha had played 259 first-class matches, with 41 wins, 89 losses and 129 draws.

Vidarbha's main home ground was always the Vidarbha Cricket Association Ground in Nagpur until 2009, when it was superseded by the newly developed Vidarbha Cricket Association Stadium at Jamtha in Nagpur.

Vidarbha's record score is 237 by Ganesh Satish against Andhra in 2019-20. The best bowling figures in an innings are 8 for 39 by Arun Ogiral against Madhya Pradesh in 1967-68, and the best bowling figures in a match are 13 for 162 by Akshay Wakhare against Gujarat in 2014-15.

Players

Current squad
Coach: Trevor Gonsalves

Players with international caps are listed in bold

Updated as on 24 January 2023

Coaching staff
 Head coach: Trevor Gonsalves
 Batting coach: Yusuf Pathan
 Bowling coach: Subroto Banerjee
 Under-19s coach: Usman Ghani
 Video analyst: Aniruddha Deshpande 
 Trainer: Amiykumar Mohanty 
 Physio: Dr Niraj Karamchandani

References

External links
Vidarbha at CricketArchive
Vidarbha Cricket Team News
Wasim Jaffer moves to Vidarbha after 19 years with Mumbai cricket team

Indian first-class cricket teams
Sport in Nagpur
Cricket in Vidarbha
1957 establishments in Bombay State
Cricket clubs established in 1957